Deoxyribonuclease V (endodeoxyribonuclease V, DNase V, Escherichia coli endodeoxyribonuclease V) is an enzyme. This enzyme catalyses the following chemical reaction

 Endonucleolytic cleavage at apurinic or apyrimidinic sites to products with a 5'-phosphate

See also 
 Deoxyribonuclease

References

External links 
 

EC 3.1.21